Kamthikhairy Dam, also called Pench Dam, is on the Pench river near Parshivni in the state of Maharashtra, India. The dam was constructed for irrigation, and supplies water to two districts of Maharashtra, Nagpur and Bhandara. The dam is located in the West Pench National Park Range, surrounded by forested hills, and is 54 km north of Nagpur.

Specifications

See also
 Dams in Maharashtra
 List of reservoirs and dams in India

References

Dams in Nagpur district
Dams completed in 1976
1976 establishments in Maharashtra